The following television stations broadcast on digital or analog channel 17 in Canada:

 CFCM-DT in Quebec City, Quebec
 CFTF-DT-2 in Trois-Pistoles, Quebec
 CIII-DT in Paris, Ontario
 CITY-DT-3 in Ottawa, Ontario
 CIVI-DT-2 in Vancouver, British Columbia
 CJIL-DT in Lethbridge, Alberta
 CKEM-DT in Edmonton, Alberta

17 TV stations in Canada